Dwane Anthony Lee (born 26 November 1979) is a former footballer who played as a midfielder. Born in England, he made two appearances for the Grenada national team at international level.

Club career
Lee was born in Hillingdon, Greater London. He began his career at Yeading and was loaned out to Aldershot Town for one-month, in November 2002, before moving to Exeter City in July 2003. After a season, Lee moved to Barnet, where he played over 50 games and won a Conference National championship medal. After half a season in the Football League, Lee returned to the Conference with Kidderminster Harriers, and then Stevenage Borough, before a spell with Maidenhead United. In May 2008, he became the first summer signing for newly promoted Conference side Kettering Town.

On 2 December 2008, he joined AFC Wimbledon after his contract was cancelled by mutual consent at Kettering in November, going straight into the starting XI for their game against Eastleigh. He then joined Bromley in August 2009, but was released after only seven appearances (six league, one FA Cup). In March 2010, he joined Boreham Wood. In August 2011, Lee signed for Lewes in the Isthmian League. Lee moved to Hayes & Yeading United in October of the same year. Lee managed the Hayes & Yeading United F.C. U23 Team. In 2019 he briefly managed London Tigers.

Honours
Barnet
Conference National: 2005

AFC Wimbledon
Conference South: 2008

Burnham
Southern Football League Division One Central: 2013

References

External links
Lee signs for Kettering

1979 births
Living people
English sportspeople of Grenadian descent
Grenadian footballers
English footballers
Footballers from the London Borough of Hillingdon
Association football forwards
Grenada international footballers
English Football League players
National League (English football) players
Isthmian League players
Southern Football League players
Barnet F.C. players
Yeading F.C. players
Aldershot Town F.C. players
Exeter City F.C. players
Kidderminster Harriers F.C. players
Stevenage F.C. players
Maidenhead United F.C. players
Kettering Town F.C. players
Halesowen Town F.C. players
AFC Wimbledon players
Bromley F.C. players
Boreham Wood F.C. players
Windsor & Eton F.C. players
Staines Town F.C. players
Lewes F.C. players
Hayes & Yeading United F.C. players
Beaconsfield Town F.C. players
Burnham F.C. players